Edward Henry Rich, 10th Baron Rich, 8th Earl of Warwick and 5th Earl of Holland (1695–1759), of Holland House, Kensington, Middlesex, was an English peer.

Career
Rich succeeded his second cousin Edward Rich, 7th Earl of Warwick, on his death in 1721.

Marriage and progeny
In 1712 he married Mary Stanton (died on 7 Nov 1769), by whom he had one daughter:
Lady Charlotte Rich (died 12 April 1791), only daughter and sole heiress.

Death and burial
He died on 7 September 1759, without male progeny, thus his titles became extinct. His monument survives in St Mary Abbots Church, Kensington. Later that year Francis Greville, 1st Earl Brooke, successfully petitioned King George II for the vacant title of Earl of Warwick.

References

1695 births
1759 deaths
17th-century English nobility
18th-century English nobility
Earls of Warwick (1618 creation)
Edward
Earls of Holland